ReMastered: Massacre at the Stadium is a 2019 documentary film about the death of singer Victor Jara in 1973, and how it turned him into a symbol of Chile's struggle.

Premise
ReMastered: Massacre at the Stadium examines the 1973 death of Chilean folk singer Victor Jara, and how it made him into a symbol and martyr for Chile's struggle within the Pinochet regime. The film investigates the account of Pedro Barrientos Núñez, a former Chilean army official and suspect in the murder of Jara, and the complex circumstances surrounding it.

Cast
 Víctor Jara
 Joan Jara
 Pascale Bonnefoy
 Joyce Horman
 Salvador Allende
 Jack Devine
 David Frost
 Augusto Pinochet
 U2

References

External links

 
 
 

2019 documentary films
2019 films
Netflix original documentary films